The 1930 Allan Cup was the Canadian senior ice hockey championship for the 1929–30 season.

Final
The series was held at Arena Gardens in Toronto.

Best of 3
Montreal 6 Port Arthur 0
Montreal 2 Port Arthur 1

Montreal AAA beat Port Arthur 2-0 on series.

References

External links
Allan Cup archives 
Allan Cup website

Allan Cup
Allan Cup